The Sports Book Awards (previously National Sporting Club Book Awards then Telegraph Sports Book Awards) is a British literary award for sports writing. It was first awarded in 2003 as part of the National Sporting Club. Awards are presented in multiple categories. Each category is judged by one of: sports writers and broadcasters, retailers and enthusiasts. The winners from each category are then opened to public vote through a website to choose an overall winner. The other major sports writing award in Britain is the William Hill Sports Book of the Year.

The award was founded by David H. Willis.

Sponsors
The awards' original sponsors included Ladbrokes, Virgin Publishing, Butler and Tanner and WH Smith. As of 2015, new sponsors included Cross Pens, Sky Sports, The Times, Littlehampton Book Services, Robert Walters, TalkSPORT, Freshtime, Human Race Group, Arbuthnot Latham and Procorre.

Previous winners

Best overall winner
2011 Promised Land – Anthony Clavane (Yellow Jersey Press)
2012 Engage: The Fall and Rise of Matt Hampson – Paul Kimmage (Simon & Schuster)
2013 Bobby's Open: Mr Jones and the Golf Shot that Defined a Legend – Steven Reid (Corinthian)
2014 The Nowhere Men: The Unknown Story of Football’s True Talent Spotters – Michael Calvin (Century)
2015 Proud - Gareth Thomas and Michael Calvin (Ebury)
2016 My Fight, Your Fight – Ronda Rousey (Arrow)

Best Autobiography/Biography
2012   Engage: The Fall and Rise of Matt Hampson – Paul Kimmage (Simon & Schuster)
2013   Seven Deadly Sins – David Walsh (Simon & Schuster)
2014 The Outsider - Jimmy Connors

Best Autobiography 
2003 	Niall Quinn: The Autobiography – Niall Quinn and Tom Humphries (Headline)
2004 	Woody and Nord – Gareth Southgate and Andy Woodman (Penguin)
2005 	Playing with Fire – Nasser Hussain (Michael Joseph)
2006 	Frank: Fighting Back – Frank Bruno with Kevin Mitchell (Yellow Jersey Press)
2007 	Back from the Brink – Paul McGrath (Century)
2008 	My Manchester United Years – Bobby Charlton (Headline)
2009 	Black and Blue – Paul Canoville (Headline)
2010 	Open: An Autobiography – Andre Agassi (HarperCollins)
2011 	Beware of the Dog – Brian Moore (Simon & Schuster)
2015   Proud - Gareth Thomas and Michael Calvin (Ebury)
2016   Formula One and Beyond: The Autobiography – Max Mosley (Simon & Schuster)
2017   No Nonsense: The Autobiography - Joey Barton (Simon & Schuster)
2018   Unbroken - Martine Wright with Sue Mott (Simon & Schuster)

Best Biography
2003 	Jack & Bobby: Story of Brothers in Conflict – Leo McKinstry (Collins Willow)
2004 	Keeper of Dreams – Ronald Reng (Yellow Jersey Press)
2005 	Basil D'Oliveira – Peter Oborne (Little Brown)
2006 	Lance Armstrong: Tour de Force – Daniel Coyle (Collins Willow)
2007 	The Death of Marco Pantani – Matt Rendell (Weidenfeld & Nicolson)
2008 	In Search of Robert Millar – Richard Moore (HarperSport)
2009 	Regga – Clay Regazzoni – Christopher Hilton (Haynes Publishing)
2010 	Harold Larwood – Duncan Hamilton (Quercus)
2011 	Trautmann's Journey – Catrine Clay (Yellow Jersey Press)
2015   Bobby Moore: The Man in Full - Matt Dickinson (Yellow Jersey Press)
2016   Speed Kings – Andy Bull (Bantam)
2017   The Maverick Mountaineer - Robert Wainwright (ABC)
2018   Ali: A Life - Jonathan Eig (Simon & Schuster)

Best International Autobiography
2016   My Fight, Your Fight – Ronda Rousey (Arrow)
2017   Find a Way - Diana Nyad (Knopf)
2018   Form - Kieren Fallon (Simon & Schuster)

Best Football Book
2007 	Sir Alf – Leo McKinstry (HarperSport)
2008 	Provided You Don't Kiss Me – Duncan Hamilton (Fourth Estate)
2009 	Inverting the Pyramid – Jonathan Wilson (Orion)
2010 	Cantona – Philippe Auclair (Macmillan)
2011 	Promised Land – Anthony Clavane (Yellow Jersey Press)
2012   A Life Too Short – Ronald Reng
2013   Barca: The Making of the Greatest Team in the World – Graham Hunter (BackPage Press)
2014   The Nowhere Men - Michael Calvin
2015   Thirty-One Nil - James Montague (Bloomsbury)
2016   Cristiano Ronaldo – Guillem Balagué (Orion)
2017   Forever Young - Oliver Kay (Quercus)
2018   The Billionaires Club - James Montague (Bloomsbury)

Best Cricket Book
2007   Sixty Summers: Cricket Since the War – David Foot and Ivan Ponting (Fairfield Books)
2008   More Than a Game: The Story of Cricket’s Early Years – John Major (HarperPress)
2009   The Way It Was – Stephen Chalke (Fairfield Books)
2010   Golden Boy – Christian Ryan (Orion)
2011   Slipless in Settle – Harry Pearson (Little Brown)
2012   Fred Trueman – Chris Waters
2013   On Warne – Gideon Haigh (Simon & Schuster)
2014   The Great Tamasha - James Astill
2015   Wounded Tiger: The History of Cricket in Pakistan - Peter Oborne (Simon & Schuster)
2016   Chasing Shadows: The Life & Death Of Peter Roebuck – Tim Lane and Elliot Cartledge (Hardie Grant)
2017   A Beautiful Game: My Love Affair with Cricket - Mark Nicholas (Allen & Unwin)
2018   Over and Out, Albert Trott - Steve Neal (Pitch Publishing)

Best Rugby Book
2008   Ripley's World – Andy Ripley (Mainstream Publishing)
2009   Seeing Red: Twelve Tumultuous Years in Welsh Rugby – Alun Carter and Nick Bishop (Mainstream Publishing)
2010   Confessions of a Rugby Mercenary – John Daniell (Ebury Press)
2011   The Grudge – Tom English (Yellow Jersey Press)
2012   Higgy – Alastair Hignell
2013   The Final Whistle: The Great War in Fifteen Players – Stephen Cooper (The History Press)
2014   City Centre - Simon Halliday
2015   Beyond The Horizon - Richard Parks (Sphere)
2016   No Borders: Playing Rugby for Ireland – Tom English (Arena Sport)
2017   The Battle - Paul O'Connell (Penguin Ireland)
2018   Wrecking Ball - Billy Vunipola with Gershon Portnoi (Headline)

Best Horse Racing Book
2011   The Story of Your Life – James Lambie (Matador)
2012   Beyond the Frame – Edward Whitaker
2013   Her Majesty's Pleasure – Julian Muscat (Racing Post Books)
2014   Henry Cecil: Trainer of Genius - Brough Scott
2015   Cheltenham Et Al - Alastair Down (Racing Post)

Best Cycling Book
2015   The Race Against The Stasi - Herbie Sykes (Aurum Press)
2016   The Racer – David Millar (Yellow Jersey Press)
2017   Triumphs and Turbulence: My Autobiography - Chris Boardman (Ebury Press)
2018   Tom Simpson: Bird on the Wire - Andy McGrath (Rapha)

Best Golf Book
2012   The 100 Greatest Ever Golfers – Andy Farrell
2013   Bobby's Open: Mr Jones and the Golf Shot that Defined a Legend – Steven Reid (Icon Books)

Best Motorsports Book
2012   Ultimate E-Type – Philip Porter
2013   That Near-Death Thing – Rick Broadbent (Orion) 

Best Illustrated Book
2003   Peter Alliss’ Golf Heroes – Peter Alliss (Virgin Books)
2004   Football Days: Classic Photos – Peter Robinson (Mitchell Beazley)
2005   The Olympics Athens to Athens: 1896–2004 – M Jacque Rogge (Weidenfeld & Nicolson)
2006   Speed Addicts: Grand Prix Racing – Mark Hughes (Collins Willow)
2007   1966 Uncovered: The Unseen Story of the World Cup in England – Peter Robinson and Doug Cheeseman (Mitchell Beazley)
2008   Goodbye Gay Meadow – Mathew Ashton (GGM Publishing)
2009   In The Frame: Great Racing Photographs – Edward Whitaker (Highdown)
2010   Centre Court: The Jewel in Wimbledon's Crown – John Barrett and Ian Hewitt (Vision Sports Publishing)
2011   61 The Spurs Double (Vision Sports Publishing)
2012   Wimbledon – Ian Hewitt and Bob Martin
2013   21 Days to Glory – Team Sky and Dave Brailsford (HarperCollins)
2014   Incredible Waves: An Appreciation of Perfect Surf - Chris Power
2015   The Age Of Innocence - ed. Reuel Golden (Taschen)
2016   1/1000: The Sports Photography of Bob Martin – Bob Martin (Vision Sports Publishing)
2017   The Lane - Adam Powley, Steve Perryman and Martin Cloake (Vision Sports Publishing)
2018   The History Makers - Sarah Juggins and Richard Stainthorpe (Pitch Publishing)

Best New Writer
2003   Kings of the Mountains: How Colombia's Cycling Heroes Changed Their Nation's History – Matt Rendell (Aurum Press)
2004   John Daly: Letting the Big Dog Eat – Gavin Newsham (Virgin Books)
2005   Feet in the Clouds – Richard Askwith (Aurum Press)
2006   My Father and Other Working Class Football Heroes – Gary Imlach (Yellow Jersey Press)
2007   The Hour: Sporting Immortality the Hard Way – Michael Hutchinson (Yellow Jersey Press)
2008   The Pyjama Game: A Journey into Judo – Mark Law (Aurum Press)
2009   When Friday Comes – James Montague (Mainstream Publishing)
2010   Eclipse – Nicholas Clee (Bantam Press)
2011   Bounce – Matthew Syed (Fourth Estate)
2012   The Ghost Runner – Bill Jones
2013   Running with the Kenyans: Discovering the secrets of the fastest people on earth – Adharanand Finn (Faber and Faber)
2014   Land of Second Chances - Tim Lewis
2015   Night Games - Anna Krien (Yellow Jersey Press)
2016   Two Hours: The Quest To Run The Impossible Marathon – Ed Caesar (Viking)
2017   And The Sun Shines Now - Adrian Tempany (Faber & Faber)

Outstanding Sports Writing Award
2014   Everest - Harriet Tuckey 
2015   Alone - Bill Jones (Bloomsbury)
2016   Barbarian Days: A Surfing Tale – William Finnegan (Corsair)
2018   Centaur - Declan Murphy and Ami Rao (Black Swan, Transworld Publishers)

Best Publicity Campaign
2010   The Man Who Cycled the World – Campaign by Madeline Toy (Random House)
2011   It's All About the Bike – Campaign by Mari Yamazaki (Particular Books)
2012   Run! – Campaign by Clare Drysdale (Allen & Unwin)
2013   Be Careful What You Wish For – Campaign by Bethan Jones (Yellow Jersey Press)
2014   Alex Ferguson: My Autobiography - Campaign by Karen Geary and Rebecca Mundy (Hodder)
2015   The Second Half by Roy Keane with Roddy Doyle - Campaign by Elizabeth Allen (Weidenfeld & Nicolson), with Jane Beaton from Kew Publicity
2016   The World of Cycling According to G'' – Campaign by Fiona Murphy (Quercus)

Sports Book Retailer of the Year
2012 Waterstones
2013 Foyles
2014 Waterstones
2015 Waterstones

Outstanding Contribution to Sports Writing
2012 Nick Hornby
2013 Christopher Martin-Jenkins
2015 Michael Parkinson
2016 Brian Glanville
2017 Hugh McIlvanney
2018 John Woodcock

References

External links
British Sports Book Awards, official website.

British literary awards
Sports writing awards
Books about sports
Awards established in 2003
2003 establishments in the United Kingdom